David Wright (born 24 October 1953 in Kent, England), is the English keyboard player and composer, who founded the new-age music label AD Music in 1989. He is also co-founder of the New Age electronic rock band Code Indigo and of the new-age music duo Callisto.

Wright has released many instrumental albums as a solo performer, establishing a strong reputation in Europe and the United States.

Discography

Solo albums
 1989 – Reflections    
 1990 – Romancing the Moon   
 1991 – Waiting for the Soundtrack   
 1991 – Marilynmba 
 1992 – Between Realities    
 1993 – Ocean Watch  
 1994 – Moments in Time   
 1995 – Dissimilar Views   
 1997 – Live at the London Planetarium    
 1998 – Three Six Zero 
 2000 – The Hypnosis Concert (from 4-CD Box set Blue)    
 2002 – Walking with Ghosts    
 2003 – Dissimilar Views 2   
 2004 – Continuum  
 2005 – Returning Tides (Best of David Wright Volume 1)   
 2005 – Deeper 
 2006 – The Tenth Planet    
 2008 – Momentum   
 2008 – Dreams and Distant Moonlight 
 2009 – Sines of life Vol 1(CD) 
 2009 – Sines of life Vol 2 (Download double) 
 2011 – The Spirit of Light (Best of David Wright Volume 2) 
 2011 – In Search of Silence 
 2012 – Connected 
 2014 – Beyond the Airwaves Vol. 1  
 2015 – Beyond the Airwaves Vol. 2 
 2017 – Prophecy with Carys
 2018 – Stranger Days

Band albums
Code Indigo
 1995 – For Whom the Bell 
 1997 – Live in Duisburg
 1998 – Uforia 
 1999 – Live at Derby Cathedral (Album Blue)
 2003 – TimeCode 
 2006 – Chill 
 2007 – In Concert 
 2013 – MELTdown 
 2013 – Meltdown Concert DVD @ Eday (DVD-r) 
 2014 – Take the Money and Run

With Robert Fox & Code Indigo
 2000 – Blue 
 2003 – Before Time (Double CDr) (Music for the Code Indigo album TimeCode)

Callisto (With Dave Massey)
 2004 – Signal to the Stars 
 2009 – Live at The Hampshire Jam (CDr) 
 2010 – NYX

Trinity (with Neil Fellowes & Nigel Turner-Heffer)
 2011 – Music for Angels

With Ian Boddy
 2009 – Shifting Sands

With Ian Boddy & Klaus Hoffmann-Hoock
 2010 – Trinity (Double CDr)

With Enterphase
 2004 – Solar Promenades

Featured compilations
 1995 – Music for Films Polygram 
 1998 – Dream & Relaxing Music New Sounds 
 1998 – Nuova Era New Sounds 
 1999 – Magic Mysteries Sony Music 
 1999 – Fantastica1999 Polygram 
 2001 – Mystic Spirits Vol 3 ZYX 
 2003 – Beyond The Skies Volume 1 Shift ZYX  
 2004 – Various Artists Ocean of Light 
 2004 – New Age Sounds Accordo 
 2004 – Cafe Oriental 3 ZYX 
 2004 – Best of Beyond the Skies Shift Music 
 2005 – Sacred Skies 
 2005 – Gregorian Dreams Volume 2 More Music 
 2007 – Mystic Spirits Classic Edition 6 ZYX 
 2007 – Mystic Spirits Vol 4 DVD ZYX 
 2008 – Mystica – ZYX 
 2008 – Gregorian Chants Greatest Hits ZYX 
 2009 – Beyond Paradise AD Music 
 2009 – Mystic Spirits Elements of Mystery ZYX
 2009 – Walking with Angels AD Music 
 2009 – Gregorian Chants Sanctus ZYX 
 2010 – Night Music AD Music 
 2010 – ChristmasAD The First Snow AD Music 
 2011 – A Little More Night MusicAD Music

Producer:
 1996 – Bekki Williams Elysian Fields 
 1998 – Bekki Williams Shadow of the Wind 
 2004 – Various Artists Ocean of Light 
 2005 – Various Artists Sacred Skies 
 2008 – Uriel – Cultures 
 2009 – Various Artists Beyond Paradise
 2009 – Various Artists Walking with Angels 
 2010 – Claudio Merlini The Colours of Music 
 2010 – Various Artists Night Music 
 2011 – Various Artists A little More Night Music 
 2010 – Various Artists ChristmasAD The First Snow 
 2012 – Dreamerproject The Road to Your Heart 
 2014 – Bekki Williams Shadow of the Wind Remaster 
 2014 – Iotronica of Moons and Stars

External links
David Wright Website
Code Indigo Website
Callisto Website
David Wright Studio Website
Claudio Merlini Website
Bekki Williams Website

1953 births
Living people
English keyboardists
Musicians from Kent